Poix-Terron is a commune located in the department of Ardennes, in the Grand Est (lit. "Great East") region of France.

Geography 
Two villages belong to the commune: Poix, and the churchless Terron-les-Poix. Poix became Poix-Terron in 1897. Poix is located on the N51, 18 km from Charleville-Mézières, and 28 km from Rethel. Terron is located 1.5 km from Poix on the D27.

The railway station in Poix-Terron is on the Soissons–Givet railway between Reims and Charleville-Mézières. The station was reopened on 1 October 2011.

History 
The town has suffered during religious wars: there was a fire in the village and castle in 1641, and a siege of the church on 8 July 1651. King Louis XIV passed through on 25 June and 7 August 1654.

On 30 August 1870, during the Franco-German war, the Affaire de Poix (The Poix Case, lit. "Poix Affair") occurred, involving the 42nd infantry regiment.

On 14 May 1940, a breach, 8 km in length, occurred between Poix-Terron and Baâlons in the French line of defence. A battalion of Spahis attempted to close the breach and held against the Germans in the battle of the Horgne.

Politics and Administration

Demographics 

In 2017, the commune was counted as having 819 inhabitants, a decrease of 2.62% compared to 2012. (Ardennes: -3.25%; France excluding Mayotte: +2.36%)

Places and Monuments

 The Roman Catholic church of Saint-Martin of Poix-Terron, built in white stone, is a historical monument, registered as such on 19 July 1926. The bell, which dates from 1599, is classified as a historical monument. In 2008, the stained-glass windows were restored and a new window depicting Saint Martin was added.
 The Monument to the Dead in front of the town hall.

Famous people from the Commune 

General Léon Pillere (1844-1911), born in the town, commanded the 60th infantry brigade.

See also
Communes of the Ardennes department

References

Communes of Ardennes (department)
Ardennes communes articles needing translation from French Wikipedia